The BR-267 is a Brazilian federal highway that crosses the Brazilian states of Minas Gerais, São Paulo and Mato Grosso do Sul.

It originates in the municipality of Leopoldina, Minas Gerais, at the junction with Highway BR-116 and continues to the Brazil–Paraguay border in Porto Murtinho, Mato Grosso do Sul.

In Minas Gerais, on the stretch between Juiz de Fora and Poços de Caldas, it is called Rodovia Vital Brazil, with a project to change it to Rodovia Presidente Itamar Franco.

Gallery

References

Federal highways in Brazil